The 1997–98 Phoenix Coyotes season was the Coyotes' second season in Phoenix, the franchise's 19th season in the NHL, its second season in Phoenix, and its 26th season overall. The Coyotes made the 1998 Stanley Cup playoffs, losing in the first round to the Detroit Red Wings.

This was the team's final season of its original tenure in the Central Division, which it had joined while still based in Winnipeg, before being realigned into the Pacific Division the following season. The Coyotes would return to the Central in 2021.

Off-season

Regular season

Final standings

Schedule and results

Playoffs

Western Conference Quarterfinals

(W3) Detroit Red Wings vs. (W6) Phoenix Coyotes 
The series began in Detroit. In Game 1, Detroit won 6–3, but in Game 2, the Coyotes came back and won 7–4. The series then shifted to Phoenix, where the Coyotes were victorious in Game 3, 3–2. However, the Coyotes' 2–1 series lead was short lived, as Detroit won 4–2 in Game 4. For Game 5 back in Detroit, the Red Wings won 3–1. In Game 6, the series went back to Phoenix, where Detroit won the game 5–2 and the series 4–2.

Player statistics

Regular season
Scoring

Goaltending

Playoffs
Scoring

Goaltending

Note: GP = Games played; G = Goals; A = Assists; Pts = Points; +/- = Plus/minus; PIM = Penalty minutes; PPG=Power-play goals; SHG=Short-handed goals; GWG=Game-winning goals
      MIN=Minutes played; W = Wins; L = Losses; T = Ties; GA = Goals against; GAA = Goals against average; SO = Shutouts; SA=Shots against; SV=Shots saved; SV% = Save percentage;

Awards and records

Transactions

Trades

Waivers

Free agents

Draft picks
Phoenix's draft picks at the 1997 NHL Entry Draft held at the Civic Arena in Pittsburgh, Pennsylvania.

See also
 1997–98 NHL season

References
 

P
P
Arizona Coyotes seasons